Southern Province is a province of Sri Lanka, containing the Galle District, Hambantota District, and Matara District. The following is a list of settlements in the province.



A
Abakolawewa, Abesekaragama, Abeyesekaragama, Acharigama, Acharigoda, Addarawellana, Agala Kanda, Agalaboda, Agaliya, Aggarahere, Ahangama, Akuressa
ambalangoda, awiththawa

B
Babarenda Central, Babarenda North, Babarenda South I, Babarenda South II, Badabadda, Badahelagoda, Badalgeda, Baddegama, Baddegama East, Baddegama North, Baddegama South, Bentota, Boossa, Beliatta

C
China Garden, Companiwatta, Companywatta

D
Dabarella, Dadalla, Daganapothaha, Daha-amuna, Dalgahakele, Daluwakgoda, Daluwatumulla, Dambawatawana, Dammala, Dammanatenna, Dammantenna, Deniyaya, Dodanduwa

E
Egodabedda, Egodaduwa, Egodagoda, Egodamulla, Egodawela, Ehelakanda, Ehelape, Ehelapola, Ehelepola, Ekkassa, Elagamuwa, elpitiya

F
Fort

G
Gabadaweediya, Gabadawidiya, Gajanayakagama, Galagama, Galagammana, Galagammulla, Galahitiya, Galapilagama, Galatuduwa, Galbada, Galboda, Ganegama, Ginimellagaha

H
Habakkala, Habaraduwa, Habaraduwa Centra, Habaraduwa Central, Habaraduwa West, Habaragaha-ela, Habarakada, Habarattawila, Habarattewala, Habarattewala, Haburugala

I
Ibbawala, Idandukita, Idantota, Igala, Ihala Aturaliya, Ihala Beligalla, Ihala Ganegama, Ihala Keembiya, Ihala Kumbukwewa, Ihala Omatta, Ihala Vitiyala, Imaduwa

J
Jalampitiya, Jamburegoda, Jamburutugoda, Jandura, Jansagama, Jomahandigoda, Jorseygoda, Jorsigoda, Julampitiya, Julamulla

K
Kabaragaha Ela, Kabaragala, Kabaragomaditta, Kabarayamulla, Kadaweddawa, Kadawedduwa, Kadduwa, Kadedduwa, Kadigamuwa, Kadihingala, Kadiragoda, Kalahe

L
Labuduwa, Lalpe, Lalwala Pahala, Lametiya, Landajulana, Landejulana, Lankagama, Lanumodara, Lanumodera, Lelkada, Lelwala, Lelwala Ihala, Lelwala Pahala, Lenaduwa, Lenagalpalata, Lenama, Lenawa, Lenewa, Lewduwa, Lewpotdeniya, Lintotapaya, Liyanagamakanda, Liyanagoda, Liyanegoda, Liyannakatuwa, Lolla, Lunama, Lunuganwehera

M
Mabingoda, Mabotuwana, Madakumbura, Madametota, Madawala, Maddegama, Maddumagegoda, Madihe East, Madihe West, Madipola, Madipola Sinhalabage, Mirissa

N
Nabadova, Nabadowa, Nadiganwela, Nagahagoda, Nagalawewa, Nagoda, Naguliadda, Nagulliyadda, Naiduwa, Nakanda, Nakandawala

O
Obadagahadeniya, Obadawatta, Okandeyaya, Okawala, Okewela, Okewelagoda, Olagama, Olagama, Olaganduwa, Oligoda, Oluara, Olupeliya, Omatta, Opata, Oture, Ovilikanda, Ovilla, Ovitipana, Owilana, Owilikanda, Owilla, Owitigamuwa, Owitipana

P
Padavkema, Padawkema, Paddapitiya, Paddapitiya, Padilikokmaduwa, Paduanga, Paduange, Pahajjawa, Pahala Aturaliya, Pahala Ganegama, Pahala Keembiya

Q

R
Radagoda, Radampola, Radaniara, Radaniyara, Radawela, Radompola, Rajapuragoda, Rajjamana, Rajjammana, Rallagerotawewa, Rallerotawewa, Rathgama

S
Sahabandukokmaduwa, Samodagama, Sapugahayaya, Sapugoda, Sapugodawela, Saputantirikanda, Seenimodera, Sigiriya, Silvetgama, Silwatgama, Sinigama

T
Talagahadiwela, Talagasgoda, Talagaspe, Talahagama, Talalla North, Talalla South, Talamporuwa, Talangalla, Talangamuwa, Talangomuwa, Talanwela, Telijjawila, Thawalama

U
Uda Ambala, Uda Aparekka, Udabalgama, Udabatgama, Udaberagama, Udagangoda, Udagomadiya, Udaheragama, Udakanuketiya, Udakerawa, Udakerewa, Udugama

V
Valamitiyawa, Velgalla, Vidaneachchigoda, Vidaneachchilagegoda, Vidanearachchigoda, Vidanegegama, Viharahena

W
Wabalakananke, Wadiya, Wadiyagoda, Waduborala, Wadugegoda, Wadumulla, Waduwadeniya, Waduweliwitiya, Wagegoda, Wagugoda, Wahala, Walgama, Weeraketiya

Y
Yakkalamulla

See also
 List of cities in Sri Lanka
 List of towns in Sri Lanka

 
Southern Province
Southern Province